El Patrón is the third studio album by Puerto Rican singer-songwriter Tito El Bambino, released on March 24, 2009, by Universal Music Latino. It was produced primarily by Monserrate with other contributions by Nérol, Marioso, Mambo Kingz, among others. El Patron was nominated for a Lo Nuestro Award for Urban Album of the Year. It also received a nomination for the Billboard Latin Music Award for Latin Rhythm Album of the Year in 2010.It sold 300,000 copies worldwide.

Critical reception

In a mostly positive review, Allmusic writer, Jason Birchmeier says the album "finds him developing as an artist and experimenting with different styles without abandoning his reggaeton roots." He also went on to say that the album is a "solid effort filled with lots of good songs and a few excellent ones." He called "El Amor" the "most obvious stylistic experiment" and the "primary highlight" and said that it "showcases Tito's singing ability."

Track listing

Special Edition and Re-Edition

El Patrón: La Victoria
On January 26, 2010, through Siente Music, Tito "El Bambino" released a special re-edition of the album, called El Patron: La Victoria. It included a few new tracks, and new guest appearances by Jenni Rivera and La India.

The digital version doesn't include the songs Feliz Navidad and the Banda version of Te Pido Perdón. The songs "Under" "Se Me Daña La Mente" were added even though the physical CD version of La Victoria edition didn't have them.

El Patrón: Invencible

In mid-2010, it had been confirmed that Tito "El Bambino" would release a new album, and that it will be a part two or three of his album, El Patrón. It was later released on February 8, 2010, through Siente music, although instead of being a re-edition like La Victoria, it was more of different album with new songs and new guests appearances with new producers.

Charts

Sales and certifications

See also
List of number-one Billboard Top Latin Albums of 2009
List of number-one Billboard Latin Rhythm Albums of 2010

Release history

References

Tito El Bambino albums
2009 albums